Wayne Wood (June 5, 1951 – November 10, 2019) was a Canadian ice hockey goaltender. He played 104 games in the World Hockey Association with the Vancouver Blazers, Toronto Toros, Calgary Cowboys, and Birmingham Bulls. He played between the pipes as a goaltender with the Montreal Junior Canadiens during a time when they won two Memorial Cups. Shortly after, Wood was drafted by the New York Rangers and then went on to enjoy an 11-year career in the WHA and AHL. During his time in the AHL, he won the Calder Cup Championship (1981) with the Adirondack Red Wings where he was MVP of the playoffs. Wood was born in Toronto, Ontario. He died in Moncton, New Brunswick on November 10, 2019.

References

External links 

1951 births
Living people
Adirondack Red Wings players
Albuquerque Six-Guns players
Birmingham Bulls players
Calgary Cowboys players
Cincinnati Stingers (CHL) players
Ice hockey people from Toronto
Johnstown Red Wings players
Montreal Junior Canadiens players
New York Rangers draft picks
Omaha Knights (CHL) players
Providence Reds players
Toronto Toros players
Tulsa Oilers (1964–1984) players
Vancouver Blazers players
Canadian expatriate ice hockey players in the United States
Canadian ice hockey goaltenders